The sitting-rising test is a clinical test which provides a significant and efficient prediction of mortality risk in the elderly. It was initially developed by Brazilian researchers in exercise and sports medicine in the 1990s. In one study of subjects between the ages of 51 and 80, those with scores in the lowest range (0 to 3) were 5–6 times more likely to die within the study period (about 6 years) than those in the group with the highest scores (8 to 10).

A 2012 study with sex- and age-reference sitting-rising test (SRT) scores derived from 6141 adults appeared in the European Journal of Preventive Cardiology with other evaluation charts in the supplemental materials.

Procedure 
Subjects are instructed by the evaluator: "Without worrying about the speed of movement, try to sit and then to rise from the floor, using the minimum support that you believe is needed." The maximum possible score on the SRT is 10 points: a possible total of 5 points for sitting down, and 5 points for rising from the floor to a standing position. Use of a hand, forearm, knee, or the side of the leg to press up from the ground—or bracing a hand on the knee—each result in a deduction of one point. The minimum possible score is 0 points. An additional 0.5 points is deducted if the evaluator perceives an unsteady execution or partial loss of balance. If the subject loses points on the first few attempts, the evaluator provides advice to help them improve their score on subsequent tries. The best scores for sitting and rising are used to determine the final score.

See also
 Timed Up and Go test
 Romberg's test

References

Diagnostic neurology
Physical examination